The Secma F16 is a French micro sports car made by Secma. It is powered by the  Renault K4M engine. In 2016, a new version using the turbocharged THP engine from the Peugeot 308 GT was released, called the Secma F16 Turbo. This features a fully enveloped front end, which was updated with smoother styling in July 2022.

References

Sports cars

Cars of France